Yan Zhiqiang is a Chinese paralympic boccia player. He participated at the 2012 Summer Paralympics in the boccia competition, being awarded the silver medal in the individual BC2 event. Zhiqiang also participated in the team BC1–2 event, being awarded the silver medal with his teammates Weibo Yuan, Zhang Qi and Kai Zhong. He participated at the 2016 Summer Paralympics in the boccia competition, being awarded the bronze medal in the individual BC2 event. Zhiqiang also participated at the 2008 Summer Paralympics in the boccia competition, winning no medal.

References

External links 
Paralympic Games profile

Living people
Place of birth missing (living people)
Year of birth missing (living people)
Chinese boccia players
Boccia players at the 2008 Summer Paralympics
Boccia players at the 2012 Summer Paralympics
Medalists at the 2012 Summer Paralympics
Boccia players at the 2016 Summer Paralympics
Medalists at the 2016 Summer Paralympics
Paralympic medalists in boccia
Paralympic boccia players of China
Paralympic silver medalists for China
Paralympic bronze medalists for China
21st-century Chinese people